The Battle of the Beanfield took place over several hours on 1 June 1985, when Wiltshire Police prevented The Peace Convoy, a convoy of several hundred New Age travellers, from setting up the 1985 Stonehenge Free Festival in Wiltshire, England. The police were enforcing a High Court injunction obtained by the authorities prohibiting the 1985 festival from taking place. Around 1,300 police officers took part in the operation against approximately 600 travellers.

The convoy of travellers heading for Stonehenge encountered a police road block seven miles from the landmark. Police claimed that some traveller vehicles then rammed police vehicles in an attempt to push through the roadblock. Around the same time police smashed the windows of some of the convoy's vehicles and some travellers were arrested. The rest broke into an adjacent field, and a stand-off developed that persisted for several hours. According to the BBC, "Police said they came under attack, being pelted with lumps of wood, stones and even petrol bombs". Conversely, The Observer states the travellers were not armed with petrol bombs and that police intelligence suggesting so "was false".

Eventually the police launched another attack during which the worst of the violent police behaviour took place. According to The Observer, during this period pregnant women and those holding babies were clubbed by police with truncheons and the police were hitting "anybody they could reach". When some of the travellers tried to escape by driving away through the fields, The Observer states that the police threw truncheons, shields, fire extinguishers and stones at them to try to stop them.

Dozens of travellers were injured, and 537 travellers were eventually arrested. This represents one of the largest mass arrest of civilians since at least the Second World War, possibly one of the biggest in English legal history.

Two years after the event, a Wiltshire police sergeant was found guilty of Actual Bodily Harm as a consequence of injuries incurred by a member of the convoy during the Battle of the Beanfield.

In February 1991 a civil court judgement awarded 21 of the travellers £24,000 in damages for false imprisonment, damage to property and wrongful arrest. The award was swallowed by their legal bill as the judge did not award them legal costs.

Background

The British New Age Travellers movement developed in the 1970s with the intended purpose of attempting to create an alternative way of life. Travellers maintained themselves partly by travelling between, organising and trading at free festivals. After a stay with CND demonstrators, one group of travellers came to be known as The Peace Convoy.

The free festival scene thus also emerged in the 1970s. The People's Free Festival at Windsor ran from 1972 until 1974 when it was violently terminated by the authorities. Stonehenge Free Festival began in 1974. In 1975 the Windsor festival switched to Watchfield but did not prove successful at the abandoned military site. Consequently, The People's Free Festival at Stonehenge, became the focal point of the movement. In 1980, the Festival was marred by significant violence, largely by biker groups.

In 1984 the Department of the Environment passed management of Stonehenge and the surrounding land to English Heritage. By that time the festival had grown in size, the attendance figure for the 1984 festival was estimated at 100,000. Due to the high attendance figures there was little authority present at Stonehenge festivals and the police were unable to shut them down or implement the law. Consequently, most illegal drugs were unrestrictedly available and advertised for purchase. Traders at the festival were neglecting to obtain licences or pay taxes.

Critics claimed that the 1984 festival had resulted in the destruction of archaeological information and on the site itself, "holes had been dug in Bronze Age barrows for latrines and as bread ovens, motorcycles had been ridden over them, churning the surface. Fences had been torn down, and a thousand young trees cut down for firewood". The clean-up cost upwards of £20,000, besides the archaeological information that was lost. Landowners also claimed that damage to Stonehenge, other property damage, trespassing, recreational drug use and bathing naked in rivers had occurred during the festival.

A civil high court injunction was consequently imposed prohibiting the proposed 1985 festival from taking place.

Main events
After staying the previous night in Savernake Forest, the Convoy on the morning of 1 June numbered up to 140 vehicles, most of them buses and vans converted into living spaces; it is estimated they contained 600 people. The police had laid down an exclusion zone 4 miles (6.4 km) around the perimeter of Stonehenge, which the convoy hoped to breach. The Convoy met resistance when the police set up a roadblock near Shipton Bellinger about 7 miles (11 km) from Stonehenge. This was achieved by tipping three lorry loads of gravel across the road. According to The Observer, the convoy evaded the main roadblock on the A303 by slipping down a side road but were then met with a second roadblock. At this juncture the police claim that some traveller vehicles rammed police vehicles in an attempt to escape the roadblock. At around the same time the police smashed the windscreens of traveller vehicles and arrested occupants.

Most traveller vehicles broke into an adjacent field, by driving through a hedgerow according to one source. A stand-off consequently ensued. Travellers made attempts to negotiate with police but the officer in charge, Assistant Chief Constable Lionel Grundy, ordered that all travellers be arrested. There were outbreaks of violence during which several members of the Convoy received head injuries. An ambulance was allowed through to take them to hospital. Police Officer Bernie Lund, who was on scene, claimed that during the stand-off, petrol bombs and sticks were thrown at officers. However The Guardian states that travellers were not armed with petrol bombs and that police intelligence suggesting that they were "was false".

At 7pm officers in riot gear entered the field and launched a final attack. Pregnant women and those holding babies were hit by police with truncheons according to The Observer, who also noted journalist Nick Davies stating that police were hitting "anybody (that) they could reach". When some travellers tried to escape by driving away through the field police allegedly threw truncheons, shields, fire-extinguishers and stones at them to stop them. The Observer and The Independent report that travellers' vehicles were smashed and set on fire.

One traveller was taken away with a suspected fractured skull.

The large majority of the travellers, over 500, were arrested on suspicion of obstructing police and obstructing the highway. One source states that this represented the largest mass arrest of civilians in English legal history, another that it was the biggest figure since the Second World War. There were insufficient holding cells in local jails to hold all those arrested. Convoy members were transported throughout the Midlands and even to northern England. Not all children and parents ended up in the same region. Most of the arrests did not result in successful prosecutions.

Traveller Alan Lodge, speaking to the BBC, described it as "an ambush that happened on a small, mild mannered bunch of people".

The UK miners' strike had ended earlier in the same year, and police compared this event with tactics used at the Battle of the Beanfield, stating: "The Police operation had been planned for several months and lessons in rapid deployment learned from the miners' strike were implemented."

Witnesses
Most independent eyewitness accounts of the events relate that the police used violent tactics against men, women and children, including pregnant women; and purposely damaged the vehicles used by the convoy.

Earl of Cardigan
The travellers had departed from Savernake Forest, which is owned by the Earl of Cardigan's family. The Earl of Cardigan decided to follow the convoy on his motorbike. The Earl describes that during the initial confrontation there were negotiations with police who insisted that the travellers would not be allowed to pass. The travellers subsequently began entering into a field. Then "police rushed out on foot, from behind their barricades. Clutching drawn truncheons and riot shields, they ran round to the driver's door of each vehicle, slamming their truncheons into the bodywork to make a deafening noise, and shouting at every driver, 'get out, get out, hand over your keys, get out'". He states that police were "smashing up vehicles" and instructions to "Get out!" often happened simultaneously, giving travellers no time to react before police used riot sticks to break the vehicles' windscreens. Cardigan described seeing a very pregnant woman being "repeatedly clubbed on the head" by police, many of whom had their ID numbers covered up. He also saw police with hammers smashing up the dashboards of several of the now-abandoned motor-coach homes.

Cardigan also described how he was approached by the police the following day, who wanted permission to remove travellers who were still at Savernake: "They said they wanted to go into the campsite 'suitably equipped' and 'finish unfinished business'. Make of that phrase what you will. I said to them, that if it was my permission they were after, they did not have it. I did not want a repeat of the grotesque events that I'd seen the day before."

Journalists
ITN Reporter Kim Sabido was at the scene and recorded a piece-to-camera in which he claimed that he had witnessed "some of the most brutal police treatment of people" that he had seen in his entire career as a journalist. He also remarked on the number of people that had been "clubbed" by police including those "holding babies in their arms". He felt that an inquiry should be held into what had happened. Sabido later claimed that when he went back to the ITN library to look at the rushes, most of the footage had "disappeared, particularly some of the nastier shots." Some of this missing footage was later rediscovered and incorporated into Operation Solstice a documentary shown on Channel 4 in 1991.

Nick Davies reported for the Observer that "There was glass breaking, people screaming, black smoke towering out of burning caravans and everywhere there seemed to be people being bashed and flattened and pulled by the hair. Men, women and children were led away, shivering, swearing, crying, bleeding, leaving their homes in pieces."

Freelance photographer Ben Gibson, engaged by The Observer that day, was arrested and charged with obstructing a police officer. He was later acquitted. Another freelance photographer, Tim Malyon, had to flee at one point.

Legal action
Twenty-four of the travellers sued Wiltshire Police for wrongful arrest, assault and criminal damage to themselves and their property. Six years after the event a verdict was reached. Twenty-one of the travellers were successful in their case and were awarded £24,000 in damages towards their false imprisonment, damage to property and wrongful arrest. The judge declined to award their legal costs and their compensation consequently went towards paying for this. Their barrister, Lord Gifford QC, stated "It left a very sour taste in the mouth."

In court, individual police officers were difficult to identify, as they had hidden their identification numbers on the day. Despite this, one police sergeant was convicted of an assault occasioning actual bodily harm on a member of the Convoy.

Police radio and video was used as evidence during the court case, however there was a recording gap in both the radio and video recordings. The recording gap in the video footage was allegedly due to the video tape breaking when the convoy was initially halted at the roadblock. There was also evidence that radio logs of conversations between officers on the day of the battle had been altered.

The Earl of Cardigan testified in court against Wiltshire Police. His testimony proved vital in supporting the allegation that police violence had been excessive. He was criticised by several national newspapers for acting as a witness against Wiltshire Police; Bill Deedes' editorial in The Daily Telegraph claimed he was a class traitor. Consequently, the Earl successfully sued for defamation.

Aftermath and legacy
Legislation was introduced in the form of the Public Order Act 1986 and later the Criminal Justice Act 1994 that made the travellers' way of life increasingly difficult to sustain.

Following the events of 1985, the four-mile blockade of Stonehenge was maintained for future summer solstices. Consequently, conflict between police and those trying to reach Stonehenge continued to take place every year. Neo-druid leader Arthur Uther Pendragon was arrested on each and every summer solstice between 1985 and 1999 whilst trying to access Stonehenge. In the summer of 1988 around 130 people were arrested and in 1989 that figure rose to 260.

For the 1999 summer solstice English Heritage granted "limited access" to Stonehenge to neo-druids. This access permission was later rescinded when 200 New Age travellers broke on to the site. Twenty people were arrested.

Despite repeated calls, an inquiry into the events of 1 June 1985 has never been honoured.

Cultural references
Singer Roy Harper's song "Back to the Stones" refers to the Battle of the Beanfield. It was recorded in 1989 and appears on his 1993 live album Unhinged.

The Hawkwind song "Confrontation" from the album Out & Intake includes a description of the day's events and includes a dramatisation of some events including the repeated phrase "I am not interested in anything you have to say".

The Levellers' song "Battle of the Beanfield", from their 1991 album Levelling the Land, was inspired by the Battle of the Beanfield.

British progressive-rock band Solstice wrote a song which comments on the Battle.  "Circles" is found on their 1997 album of the same name, and includes what sounds like reporting from the battle, with Kim Sabido's voice-over.

The song "Itinerant Child", by Ian Dury and Chaz Jankel, which appears on the 1998 album Mr. Love Pants, by Ian Dury & The Blockheads, was inspired by Dury's experiences during the incident.

The police riot is a feature of the 2001 fictional novel He Kills Coppers by Jake Arnott, partially following changes in police culture between the 1960s and the 1980s, later made into an ITV TV series. The confrontation is also featured in the 2018 novel The Fountain in the Forest by Tony White.

The attitude of UK police towards hippies was parodied in an episode of the Young Ones in which Neil, a hippie, becomes a policeman who then leads a raid on his hippie friends. This prescient episode was aired 13 months before the 1985 battle.

See also
Stonehenge Free Festival
New Age Travellers
Glastonbury Festival

References

Further reading
The Battle of the Beanfield, Andy Worthington, Enabler Publications, 2005.

External links
 Alan Lodge: Stonehenge and the 'Battle of the Beanfield' 
 Summer solstice: How the Stonehenge battles faded at BBC News
 Battle of the Beanfield - The story ten years on at SchNEWS
 Battle of the Beanfield - ITN News Report and footage at YouTube
 Operation Solstice (1991) - Channel 4 Critical Eye documentary at YouTube

Free festivals
1985 in England
History of Wiltshire
Stonehenge
Law enforcement in England and Wales
Counterculture
Counterculture festivals
20th century in Wiltshire
Police brutality in the United Kingdom